Greater Moncton is a census metropolitan area comprising Moncton, Riverview, and Dieppe in New Brunswick, Canada.

Population
Greater Moncton has a population of 157,717 (2021). Migration is mostly from other areas of New Brunswick (especially the north), Nova Scotia (13%), and Ontario (9%). 62% of new arrivals to the city are Anglophone and 38% are Francophone.

The census metropolitan area (CMA) grew by 9% between 2016 and 2021. The census metropolitan area had a population of 157,717 as of the 2021 national census, which makes it the largest metropolitan area in the province of New Brunswick and the second-largest in the Maritime Provinces, after Halifax. The CMA includes the city of Dieppe (population 25,384), town of Riverview (19,667), Moncton Parish (9,811), Memramcook (4,778), Coverdale Parish (4,466), and Salisbury (2,284).

There are 2,990 Aboriginal people living in Moncton, who make up 4.3% of the city's population. There are 3,305 visible minorities in Moncton. Black peoples and South Asians are the largest visible minority groups, comprising 1.7% and 0.7% of the city's population, respectively. There is also a growing Korean community in Moncton.

Governance
The greater Moncton area contains nine of New Brunswick's 49 provincial electoral districts: Moncton Centre, Moncton East, Moncton South, Moncton Southwest, Moncton Northwest, Dieppe, Shediac Bay-Dieppe, Riverview and Albert. Of the nine members of the Legislative Assembly that represent greater Moncton, five belong to the Liberal party and four belong to the Progressive Conservative party.

The current federal MP for Moncton—Riverview—Dieppe is Ginette Petitpas Taylor (Liberal), as of the 2015 and 2019 federal elections.

Tourist attractions

Magnetic Hill is on the northwestern outskirts of Moncton and is now the city's most famous attraction. It is a gravity hill optical illusion, where the local topography gives the impression that you are going uphill when in fact you are going downhill.

The "Magnetic Hill Illusion" is a popular tourism draw and both the city and province have built major tourism developments on the surrounding properties to capitalize on this. The complex includes The Magnetic Hill Zoo, a nationally accredited and award-winning zoo with over 400 animals displayed in themed exhibit areas. It is the largest zoo in Atlantic Canada, has well-developed and popular educational program, and was ranked as the fourth best zoo in Canada in 2007. Also on site is Magic Mountain, the largest water park in Atlantic Canada, with a half dozen large water slides, a lazy river, wave pool, children's splash pool, and a 36-hole mini-golf course. An adjacent amusement park is now under construction and will be completed in 2017.  The Magnetic Hill Concert Site, a large outdoor concert facility which holds one or two large concerts every year is located nearby. The Rolling Stones performed there in 2005 in front of 85,000 fans. The Eagles played there in the summer of 2008 in front of 55,000 fans. AC/DC and Bon Jovi played at the hill in 2009, with the crowd for the AC/DC concert exceeding 70,000. The Magnetic Hill Concert Site has developed a reputation for holding the largest concert productions in the entire country. U2 played the final concert of their worldwide U2 360° Tour at Magnetic Hill on 30 July 2011. The Casino New Brunswick, which also encompasses a hotel and 2,000 seat entertainment venue also opened at Magnetic Hill in 2010. The performance space at the Casino New Brunswick has already hosted many top acts on the casino circuit.

The Bass Pro Complex is adjacent to Champlain Place and is co-managed by Cadillac Fairview.  It includes a Chapters bookstore, multiplex cinema complex and includes a Bass Pro Shop.

Sports
Greater Moncton has many golfing facilities. There are nine 18-hole golf courses in the census metropolitan area, four of which are residential courses with courseside housing developments either existing or under construction. Both the Royal Oaks and Fox Creek golf clubs can be considered championship courses, with Royal Oaks being the first Rees Jones designed golf course in Canada. Other notable courses include the Moncton Golf & Country Club, Hillsborough Golf Club, Memramcook Valley Golf Club, Maplewood Golf & Country Club and the Mountain Woods Golf Club.

Metro Moncton government services 
Metro Moncton Water and Sewer System – The water system used comes from The Turtle Creek Reservoir.
Codiac Transpo – Public transit system.

List of towns, communities and cities

See also
List of schools in Greater Moncton
Events in Greater Moncton
 Transportation in Greater Moncton

Neighbouring regions
Memramcook Region
Greater Shediac
Tantramar Region

References

 
Geographic regions of New Brunswick
Metropolitan areas of New Brunswick